French President Emmanuel Macron implemented the Service national universel (SNU), the General National Service, which will be optional for all male and female citizens aged 16 to 25 starting in 2021. This voluntary service lasts for a month and can be performed in both civil and military facilities. The aim of this civil conscription service is to convey French values, to strengthen social cohesion and to promote social engagement. As is emphasized, it is not a matter of reintroducing conscription. This service will finally replace the mandatory Journée Défense et Citoyenneté (JDC), the "Defence and Citizenship Day", that was established in 1998, after suspending conscription for the military service.

Voluntary program 
The basis of this voluntary service is to "increase the cohesion of the nation". For financial reasons, the service lasts one month only and is not compulsory. The draftees must wear uniform-like clothing, they have to hand over their mobile phones to their supervisors and are placed in collective accommodations far away from their home community. Half of the service is performed with civics and theoretical training. The daily routine follows a strict schedule: in the morning the anthem is sung at the flag roll call, and afterwards courses must be attended, such as a first aid course, an introduction to the written driver's license test, and learning rules of conduct in the event of a terrorist attack. The other half of the time has to be fulfilled with assignment in a non-profit organization, the military, the police, or a fire department.

Full implementation 

From 2021 until full implementation in 2026, the SNU may become mandatory for all young citizens, although this possibility is currently denied by Macron. The completion of the SNU could become the prerequisite for getting the French Baccalauréat, the university-entrance diploma, and driving license examination.

See also 
 Civil conscription
 Conscription in France

References 

Military history of France
France